Hypanartia paullus (Antillean mapwing) is a butterfly of the family Nymphalidae. It is found in Jamaica, Cuba, Hispaniola and Puerto Rico. It occurs in a wide variety of wooded habitats from sea level to 1,900 meters.

The length of the forewings is about 29 mm. Adults have two hindwing tails. They are most frequently encountered perching along the forest edge on the tops of leaves with the wings half open or nectaring on a variety of flowers, including Eupatorium, Daucus, Palicourea, Tournefortia, Urera, Senecio and Canna species. Adults are on wing year round, but the peak flight period occurs between June and August.
 
The larvae feed on Trema micrantha and Piper species.

References

Nymphalini
Taxa named by Johan Christian Fabricius
Butterflies described in 1793